Stirellus bicolor is a species of leafhopper native to North America. Two color forms are known. Adults found during the summer in hot climates are typically iridescent with prominent black stripes. Specimens in cooler climates are drab with translucent wings. The two varieties were originally thought to be separate species.

Stirellus bicolor feeds on bluestem grasses and broomsedge.

References

External links
Stirellus bicolor at Bugguide.net

Hemiptera of North America
Insects described in 1892
Taxa named by Edward Payson Van Duzee
Deltocephalinae